North Massapequa is a hamlet and census-designated place (CDP) located on Long Island within the Town of Oyster Bay in Nassau County, on Long Island, in New York, United States. It is considered part of the Greater Massapequa area, which is anchored by Massapequa. The population was 17,886 at the 2010 census.

Geography

Demographics

As of the census of 2000, there were 19,152 people, 6,281 households, and 5,288 families residing in the CDP. The population density was 6,333.0 per square mile (2,448.6/km2). There were 6,333 housing units at an average density of 2,094.1/sq mi (809.7/km2). The racial makeup of the CDP was 97.32% White, 0.22% African American, 0.02% Native American, 1.15% Asian, 0.55% from other races, and 0.74% from two or more races. Hispanic or Latino of any race were 3.23% of the population.

There were 6,281 households, out of which 36.5% had children under the age of 18 living with them, 71.9% were married couples living together, 9.3% had a female householder with no husband present, and 15.8% were non-families. 13.2% of all households were made up of individuals, and 7.8% had someone living alone who was 65 years of age or older. The average household size was 3.05 and the average family size was 3.33.

In the CDP, the population was spread out, with 24.4% under the age of 18, 6.2% from 18 to 24, 30.4% from 25 to 44, 22.6% from 45 to 64, and 16.4% who were 65 years of age or older. The median age was 39 years. For every 100 females, there were 93.1 males. For every 100 females age 18 and over, there were 90.3 males.

The median income for a household in the CDP was $70,825, and the median income for a family was $76,958. Males had a median income of $54,754 versus $35,859 for females. The per capita income for the CDP was $25,957. About 1.5% of families and 2.9% of the population were below the poverty line, including 2.4% of those under age 18 and 3.0% of those age 65 or over.

Like the other Massapequas, North Massapequa is predominantly Italian American, with nearly 50% of residents claiming Italian ancestry.

Education
North Massapequa is located within the boundaries of (and is thus served by) the Farmingdale Union Free School District, the Massapequa Union Free School District, and the Plainedge Union Free School District. As such, children who reside within the hamlet and attend public schools go to school in one of these three districts, depending on where they live within North Massapequa.

Notable people
 Manjul Bhargava, mathematician, studied at the local high school 
 Steve Guttenberg, actor, grew up in North Massapequa and attended Plainedge High School (class of 1976)
 Joe Pantorno, sports editor for amNewYork newspaper, grew up in North Massapequa
 Joseph Saladino, New York State Assemblyman
 Marilyn Singer, author of children's books, grew up in North Massapequa

References

Oyster Bay (town), New York
Census-designated places in New York (state)
Hamlets in New York (state)
Census-designated places in Nassau County, New York
Hamlets in Nassau County, New York